An Appointed Time, released in 2003 on Axiom Records, is a gospel music album by American urban contemporary gospel group Witness. This was the group's first release in five years since they had disbanded in 1999. The group reunited in 2003 with founding member Lisa Page Brooks, Laeh Jones, the return of Lou Ann Stewart and the debut of Brooks' daughter and future Sunday Best winner Tasha Page-Lockhart. This album also includes an update remake of their previous hit 'Standard".

Track listing 
"Battles"
"Yes I Touched Him"
"Clap Your Hands"
"Secret Place"
"I Got a Life"
"Appointed Time"
"For Me"
"Surely a Change"
"The Word"
"The River"
"Standard"

Personnel
Lisa Page Brooks: Vocals 
Laeh Jones: Vocals
Lou Ann Stewart: Vocals
Natasha Page: Vocals

References

2003 albums
Witness (gospel group) albums